TOWeb is a WYSIWYG website creation software for Microsoft Windows and Mac OS X that focuses on web publishing. The latest version 5 creates HTML5/CSS3 responsive websites compatible with any device. It has some limitations such as one can not open an external web site for editing.

History

The first version of TOWeb was developed during 2 years from 2003 to 2005 under the project name "WebGen". It was primarily intended for beginners without any HTML knowledge in website creation. The first version 1.0 was released on August 6, 2005. The following releases 2.0, 3.0, 4.0...have brought new features like the ability to create online stores. The latest version 5.0 released in June 2013 follow the Responsive Web Design trend by allowing the creation of websites compatible with any device.

Features
 Responsive websites
 Website templates
 Live preview and content editing
 HTML5 & CSS3
 Pages, Albums, Catalogs
 E-commerce module
 YouTube & HTML5 videos, Google maps...
 Multilingual websites
 Built-in FTP uploader

Version history 
 Version 10.0 released on November 26, 2021, brings new e-Commerce features such as customer accounts, support of Stripe payments, images by sub-products, a re-designed checkout process, a single-product shopping cart mode but also a support of PHP 8, SVG images and an improved display and navigation of the generated websites for a better mobile first experience
 Version 8.0 released on September 10, 2019, brings the possibility of playing background videos, displaying texts when hovering over images, using or importing any web fonts, better secure forms web, improve the SEO of a site and its sharing on social networks as well as improvements for online sales such as the backoffice able to update the stock of products in real time and volume pricing
 Version 7.0 released on December 4, 2017, provides the ability to create single-page sites or multi-page sites with full-screen paragraphs and pages using parallax effect. It also introduces many widgets (such as key figures, notes, plans & prices, responsive tables, time counters or forms), optimizations for faster page loading and a new integrated FTP publishing module, more efficient. And it also provides automated features to assist you in making your web site compliant to the General Data Protection Regulation (GDPR) 
 Version 6.0 release June 23, 2015 introduced the ability to create new types of pages (calendars, articles, agreement page), the support for Retina displays, photo albums in full screen, new effects on images, new objects (such as graphs, countdowns, Twitter feed or timestamps), an integrated website optimizer tool to improve the SEO of sites and new e-commerce capabilities such as sales of digital files (e-books, music, photos, etc.) and management of related products...
 Version 5.0 released June 18, 2013 introduced a fully rewritten editor and generator for creating responsive websites, live previewing and editing. Many features from former versions have been removed like the outdated theme generator or the wiki editor.
 Version 4.0 released June 16, 2011 introduced unicode support, a rewritten e-commerce module, Google Maps and YouTube objects, polls, automatic translations...
 Version 3.0 released June 19, 2009 introduced server side php scripting (i-services), ads insertion, SEO features, Microsoft Word & Microsoft Excel import...
 Version 2.0 released June 19, 2007 introduced a new user interface, Windows Vista compatibility, submenus, slideshows, html scripting, rss...
 Version 1.07 was released January 31, 2006 and introduced the e-commerce features for the first time in TOWeb
 Version 1.0 was released August 6, 2005

Language availability 
TOWeb is available in the following languages: English, French, Italian, Spanish, Portuguese.

See also
 List of HTML editors
 Responsive web design
 Tableless web design

References

External links
 Official website

HTML editors
Web development software
2005 software
Windows text-related software
Web design